Ray Holden (born 3 September 1959) is a former Australian rules footballer who played with Melbourne in the Victorian Football League (VFL). He also played for West Perth and Perth in the West Australian Football League (WAFL).

Holden played his first game for West Perth in 1979 but wasn't a regular section until 1981. He was joined by his former Tuart Hill coach Dennis Cometti in 1982 and in the same year played three interstate football matches for Western Australia, starring at full-back against both South Australia and Victoria.
 
He only made three appearances with Melbourne in 1984, having been unable to play in his favoured full-back position, which had been taken up by Danny Hughes, another first year player.

Unable to transfer back to West Perth as they believed Melbourne were asking for an exorbitant amount of money, Holden was instead signed by Perth. After two injury plagued seasons, Holden returned to West Perth, where he would finish his WAFL career.

References

1959 births
Australian rules footballers from Western Australia
Melbourne Football Club players
West Perth Football Club players
Perth Football Club players
Western Australian State of Origin players
Living people